Johannes Jacobus "Koos" Köhler (25 November 1905 in Amsterdam – 6 February 1965 in Sloten) was a Dutch water polo player. He competed at the 1928 Summer Olympics, where the Dutch team shared fifth place. Köhler played all three matches, together with his cousin Sjaak, and scored seven goals.

References

1905 births
1965 deaths
Dutch male water polo players
Water polo players at the 1928 Summer Olympics
Olympic water polo players of the Netherlands
Water polo players from Amsterdam
20th-century Dutch people